Tselinny is a rural locality (a settlement) in Sovkhozskoye Rural Settlement, Nikolayevsky District, Volgograd Oblast, Russia. The population was 25 as of 2010.

Geography 
Tselinny is located in steppe of the Transvolga, 68 km ESE of Nikolayevsk (the district's administrative centre) by road. Razdolnoye is the nearest rural locality.

References 

Rural localities in Nikolayevsky District, Volgograd Oblast